George Carnegie may refer to:
 George Carnegie, 6th Earl of Northesk, British naval officer
 George Carnegie, 9th Earl of Northesk, British nobleman and soldier
 Lord George William Carnegie, son of David Carnegie, 4th Duke of Fife